Lynne Littman (born June 26, 1941) is an American film and television director and producer.

Her best known work is Testament (1983) and she has won several awards including an Academy Award for her documentary short film Number Our Days (1976).

Early life and education 
Littman was born June 26, 1941, in New York City. She attended Music & Art High School and Sarah Lawrence College, and graduated with a Bachelor of Arts degree in 1962. She also studied at the Sorbonne from 1960 to 1961.

Career 
Littman began her career in the industry by working as a secretary for WNET (New York). In the following years she worked at a number of freelance jobs in different areas of film. It was until the 1970s when she began working for National Education Television. It is here that she began to explore her future in film journalism.

Commonly she worked with Mort Silverstein, who was known for having a passion for hard-hitting news practices. They made a follow-up documentary to Edward R. Murrow's Harvest of Shame, titled What Harvest for the Reaper. She made several award-winning documentary shorts, including The Matter of Kenneth (1973). Her most notable short documentary film was Number Our Days (1976), based on the field work of anthropologist Barbara Myerhoff; this film received an Academy Award in 1977.

Littman was one of the Original Six, a group of women directors who created the Women's Steering Committee of the Directors Guild of America, to protest against gender discrimination in Hollywood.

Littman's first feature film was Testament (1983), about a family struggling to survive after a nuclear fallout. The film is based on a short story titled "The Last Testament" by Carol Amen. Littman had been reading the story with her son when she had the idea to adapt it. Many had wanted to obtain the film; however, Littman had managed to secure the rights first. She immediately went about trying to find money for the film. Eventually, a producer at PBS' American Playhouse gave her $500,000 for a 60-minute movie that would involve no studio interference. However, the budget had to be expanded to $750,000 when the screenwriter turned in a script for a 90-minute film that was well received by all involved. Littman stated how proud she was that the film was completed under budget, yet the editing process had taken five months longer than the standard television film. The film was a success upon release and garnered an Academy Award nomination for its lead actress Jane Alexander.

Following Testament, Littman made films infrequently. In 1999, she made two films: Freak City, and Having Our Say, which were aired on television on the same day and in the same time-slot.

Personal life 
Littman was married to Taylor Hackford from 1977 to 1987. She has one child, Alexander Hackford, as well as a stepson, Rio Hackford. In 1985 she took a ten-year hiatus from film making to raise her child. During the 1980s and 1990s Littman served on the advisory board of the National Student Film Institute.

Archive
Littman's moving image collection is held at the Academy Film Archive.  The archive preserved her film Number Our Days in 2007.

Filmography 
 In the Matter of Kenneth (1973)
 Number Our Days (1976)
 Once a Daughter (1980)
 Testament (1983)
 In Her Own Time (1985)
 Cagney & Lacey: True Convictions (1996)
 Freak City (1999)
 Having Our Say: The Delany Sisters' First 100 Years (1999)
 Testament at 20 (2003)

Awards and nominations 
Littman has won or has been nominated for multiple awards for both her theatrical and television movies. These include winning an Academy Award for Best Short Documentary in 1977 for Number Our Days. She has also four Los Angeles Emmy Awards, from 1972 to 1974, and in 1977. As well four Cine Golden Eagle nominations for Running My Way (1982) and In Her Own Time (1985).

References

External links
 

1941 births
The High School of Music & Art alumni
Living people
Sarah Lawrence College alumni
University of Paris alumni
Film directors from New York City